Walter Brandorff (born 1943 in Munich, Germany; died 8 August 1996, in Carinthia, Austria) was a German–Austrian author.

Biography 

Born in Munich, Brandorff—who led a quite solitary live, and whose biography lies in the dark to a wide extent—spent the largest part of his life in the Austrian state of Carinthia. Until his retirement in 1991, he worked as a court secretary and held the title of Wirklicher Hofrat.

Three novels and two volumes containing smaller stories by Brandorff—until then released by himself through self-publishing—have been brought out in the years 1989–1996. In these works—which are each considered outstanding among appreciators—Brandorff combined elements of splatter and erotic with the narrative structure of classical horror literature.

On 8 August 1996 Brandorff was killed in a helicopter accident near his residence in Carinthia. His books have meanwhile been re-issued by the German publishing house Verlag Lindenstruth.

Bibliography 

 The House by the Lake. An Uncanny Novel
 I Will Eat Your Heart. 7 Evil Tales
 The Year of Horror. Satan in St. Judas. A Calendar Tale
 The Dead are Alive and Other Evil Tales
 Quinter's Last Winter. A Horror Novel

See also

List of horror fiction authors

1943 births
1996 deaths
People from Carinthia (state)
German male short story writers
German short story writers
German horror writers
Writers from Munich
20th-century German novelists
German male novelists
20th-century German short story writers
20th-century German male writers